Min Phone Myat (born 9 October 1997) is a Burmese television and film actor and singer. He gained popularity among the audiences after starring her role as Maung Phone in MRTV-4 television series Say Ta Lone Maung Phone (2021).

Career
In 2018, he starred in his first MRTV-4 drama series It was on Yesterday 2 alongside Aung Min Khant, Khar Ra, Tyron Bejay, Kyaw Kyaw Bo, Aye Myat Thu, Hsu Pan Htwar and Than Thar Moe Theint.

In 2019, he took on his first big-screen role in The Three Men, She Loves where he played the main role with Yan Aung, Min Oo, Moht Moht Myint Aung, Eaindra Kyaw Zin and Emily Bo which premiered in Myanmar cinemas on 23 May 2020.

In 2020, he portrayed the male lead in the drama series Mar Yar Hlae Kwat, alongside Poe Kyar Phyu Khin, Aung Paing, Khant, Mya Hnin Yee Lwin and
Thuta Aung. In the same year, he starred in  dramatic television series with LGBT characters Evening Miracle alongside Htet Aung Shine, Htoo Thar and Htet Amara San.

In 2022, he gained increased attention and popularity with his role as Maung Phone in the horror series Say Ta Lone Maung Phone alongside Mone, Kyaw Htet, Khaing Thazin Ngu Wah, Yan Lin Aung, Khin Moht Moht Aye and A Lin Thit.

Filmography

Film (cinema)
The Three Men, She Loves (2019)

Television series
It was on Yesterday 2 (2018)
Toxic season 2 (2019)
Mar Yar Hlae Kwat (2020) 
Evening Miracle (2020)
Say Ta Lone Maung Phone (2021)

References

External links

Living people
1997 births
Burmese male models
Burmese male film actors
21st-century Burmese male actors
People from Yangon